The "National Anthem of the Islamic Republic of Mauritania" was the national anthem of Mauritania between 1960 and 2017.

History
The anthem's lyrics are taken from a poem written in the late 18th century by Baba Ould Cheikh, while the melody was arranged by Russian-French composer Tolia Nikiprowetzky. It was adopted upon independence from France in 1960. The unusual and highly complex rhythm of it makes it almost impossible to sing. For this reason, it is often erroneously listed as wordless. It was replaced by the current national anthem on 16 November 2017 after the Mauritanian constitutional referendum of 2017.

Lyrics

Notes

References

External links
Audio of the national anthem of Mauritania, with information and lyrics

Historical national anthems
African anthems
National anthem compositions in B-flat minor